Sh2-54 is an extended bright nebula in the constellation of Serpens.

In its core there are many protostars and many infrared sources; some of these sources, like IRAS 18151−1208, are most probably very young high-mass stars. The older star population in this region has an average age of 4–5 million years, and its components are grouped in the open cluster NGC 6604.

Sh2-54 belongs to an extended nebulosity that includes also the Eagle Nebula and the Omega Nebula. The young high-mass stars of this region constitute the Serpens OB1 and Serpens OB2 OB association.

Gallery

See also 
H II region

References

External links

Sky-Map.org – Sharpless Catalogue (from 51 to 60) 
Star Formation Region Avedisova 277 – Galaxy Map

H II regions
Serpens (constellation)
054
Star-forming regions
Stellar associations